Michael Joseph Mendoza (born November 26, 1955) is a former professional baseball player.

Mike attended McClintock High School in Tempe, AZ. He was selected in the 5th round (116th overall) by the Houston Astros in the 1973 Amateur Baseball Draft.

In his major league debut on September 7, 1979, Mendoza pinch ran for Art Howe in bottom of the 8th inning. On September 26 against the Atlanta Braves at Fulton County Stadium, Mendoza pitched in his only game in the 8th inning for the Astros, facing three batters Bob Horner, Dale Murphy, and Barry Bonnell, and not allowing any baserunners.

Mendoza pitched in the Minor leagues from 1973 to 1981 in the Astros, New York Mets, and Chicago Cubs minor league systems.

References

External links

Pelota Binaria (Venezuelan Winter League)

1955 births
Living people
American baseball players of Mexican descent
American expatriate baseball players in Mexico
Baseball players from Inglewood, California
Cardenales de Lara players
American expatriate baseball players in Venezuela
Charleston Charlies players
Columbus Astros players
Covington Astros players
Dubuque Packers players
Houston Astros players
Iowa Oaks players
Leones de Yucatán players
Major League Baseball pitchers
Mexican League baseball pitchers
Tidewater Tides players
Tucson Toros players